Ali-Aye-Ligang or Ali-Ai-Ligang (in Assamese: আলি আঈ লৃৃৃগাং ) a spring festivity associated with agriculture celebrated by the Mising or Mishing tribal people of Assam and other Northeast indian states on the occasion of the beginning of the Ahu paddy cultivation. The festival marks onset of sowing seeds. The name of the festival is made up of three terms, 'Ali', legumes, 'Aye', seed and 'Ligang', to sow. The festival begins on the first Wednesday of the Phalguna (ফাগুন), the 12th month of the Hindu calendar.

Time of the festival
The festival begins on 'Ligange lange', the first Wednesday of 'Gimur Polo', which occurs in February in the Gregorian calendar or on Wednesday of the month of Fagun of  the Assamese calendar and in the month of February in English calendar which lasts for five days. Its 2016 date was 2 February.

Activities
In this festival young people of the community in particular participate 'GUMRAAG SOMAN' and dance to the tune of folk songs and  melodious 'oi: nitom'.  The first day of the festival is marked by the ceremonial start of paddy sowing and throughout the festival many others activities such as ploughing and tree cutting are forbidden.

Feast
The last day of festival called as ‘Lilen’ is observed with a grand community feast. 
During this festival, Misings indulge in great banquet with Poro Apong or Nogin Apong (homemade Rice wine) with various dishes, especially made with pork meat. ‘Purang Apin’ (packed boiled rice) is cooked in water with special leaves. This is a special dish prepared by Misings which is cooked only during Ali Aye Ligang.

Dance forms & songs
In this festival a popular dance is performed by the young Mising people which is known as Gumrag. The formal dance of the festival starts from the easternmost house of the village and in the end it extending towards the field and the river. This dance is performed by encircling the courtyard of the house of the villagers.

Songs &  music
The songs of Ali-Aye-Ligang do not remain restricted to the songs of youth alone. The subjects and themes of the songs are varied. They include the life of a man, his sufferings in this life and his death. Apart from them, the songs describe the matters of individual love and affection including joy and pain. Mainly the songs of the festival speak of the various experiences of the Misings in their day-to-day life. The Music composed for these festivals consists of instruments like the dhul, taal, gong and gungang (gagana).

See also
 Po:rag

References

External links
 
 
 Ali-ai-Ligang is celebrated in Sivasagar district, assamtimes.org.
 Photos  at the themishingsassam.com
Ali Ai Ligang: Everything you need to know about the Mising spring extravaganza

Festivals in Assam
Spring festivals
February observances
Mising people